Leonard Hilton McGurr (born November 17, 1955), known as Futura, and formerly known as Futura 2000, is an American graffiti artist.

Biography
He started to paint illegally on New York City's subway in the early 1970s, working with other artists such as ALI. From 1974 to 1978, he served in the U.S. Navy and traveled all over the world. In the early 1980s he showed with Patti Astor at the Fun Gallery, along with Keith Haring, Jean-Michel Basquiat, Richard Hambleton and Kenny Scharf.

Futura painted backdrops live on-stage for British punk rock band The Clash's 1981 European tour. In 1985, he was on the first meeting of the graffiti and urban art movement in Bondy (France), on the VLP's initiative, with Speedy Graphito, Miss Tic, SP 38, Epsylon Point, Blek le Rat, Jef Aérosol, Nuklé-Art, Kim Prisu, Banlieue-Banlieue. More recently, he is a successful graphic designer and gallery artist.

One of the most distinctive features of Futura's work is his abstract approach to graffiti. While the primary focus, during the 1980s, of the majority of graffiti artists was lettering, Futura pioneered abstract street art, which has since become more popular.  Conversely, his aerosol strokes are regarded as different from those of his peers, as they are as thin as the fine lines usually associated with the use of an airbrush.

While he is primarily known as a graffiti artist, much of his work is as an illustrator and graphic designer of album covers, first becoming involved with The Clash; producing a sleeve for their "This Is Radio Clash" 7" single and handwriting the sleeve notes and lyrics sheet for their album Combat Rock (1982). He also toured extensively with The Clash during the Combat Rock tours, "performing" with them on stage by spray painting backdrops whilst the band performed. His rap appeared on the Clash song "Overpowered by Funk."

Years later James Lavelle resurrected Futura's career by getting him, alongside Ben Drury, to produce the artwork for several releases on Mo' Wax records; this also led to Futura producing the imagery which has largely defined Lavelle's Unkle project.

During the 1990s he was involved with clothing companies such as GFS, Subware and Project Dragon. More recently much of Futura's artwork has evolved into the production of collectible toys, sneakers; and a diverse range of creative media, working with Recon, Nike, Medicom Toy, Undercover, Supreme, Levi's and A Bathing Ape.

Futura also designs his own clothing under the label Futura Laboratories with a store located in Fukuoka, Japan.

Futura was interviewed and featured in the 2005 sneaker documentary Just For Kicks.

His 2012 exhibition Future-Shock was curated by Nemo Librizzi and shown by Andy Valmorbida in New York City. Past galleries who have organized one man exhibitions include Fun Gallery, Tony Shafrazi Gallery, Philippe Briet Gallery, Galerie du Jour Agnès B., and Galerie Jérôme de Noirmont. Museum exhibitions include New York / New Wave at PS1 (1981), Coming from the Subway at Groninger Museum (1992), Beautiful Losers (2004) and Art in the Streets at Museum of Contemporary Art, Los Angeles (2011).

In 2012, Futura designed the special edition Hennessy V.S. bottle.

In 2017, Futura designed a collection of T-shirts with Uniqlo.

In 2019, Futura designed a pointman bobblehead, a baseball jersey, and a baseball cap with the New York Mets.

In late 2019, Futura collaborated with Funko to design decals for a Star wars line sold exclusively at Target. Two designs were falsely claimed to be his but were in fact designed in-house by Funko [Red and Black Boba Fetts, both the 4 and 10 inch variants].

In 2020, Futura designed in collaboration with BMW a bespoke series of vehicles that were shown at Frieze LA 2020 in Los Angeles, US.

In September 2020 a pair of Nike sneakers that he designed, known as the "Leonard Hilton McGurr ‘Futura’ Nike Dunk High Pro SB ‘FLOM’" sold at auction for US$63,000.

Publications
1981: Events, Artist invite Artists. New York, US: New Museum. Text by Betty Fox. The New Museum of Contemporary Art, New York
1983: New Art at the Tate Gallery. Text by Michael Compton. Tate Gallery, London
1987: Spraycan Art. Texts by Henry Chalfant, James Prigoff, Thames & Hudson
1987: New York Now. Texts by Carl Haenlein. Kestner-Gesellschaft, Hanovre, Germany
1988: Subway Art. Texts by Martha Cooper et Henry Chalfant. Holt Paperbacks
1989: Futura 2000: Œuvres récentes. Text by Elisabeth Hess, Musée de Vire, Vire, France
1992: Coming from the Subway – New York Graffiti Art. Froukje Hoekstra, Stefan Eins et alt. Karl Muller Verlag 
1997: New York Graffiti Art: Coming From The Subway: Histoire et Developpement d’un Mouvement Controverse. Farthest Star, VBI, 1992, VBI 1997
1998: Generations of youth: youth cultures and history in twentieth-century America. Texts by Joe Austin, Michael Willard, NYU Press
1999: Pittura Dura: Dal Graffitismo alla Street Art. Texts by Luca Massimo Barbero, Renato Barilli et alt. Electa, Milan, Italy
2000: Futura. Texts by Ben Drury, Liz Farrelly, Andrew Holmes. Booth-Clibborn. .
2000: The new beats: culture, musique et attitudes du hip-hop. Texts by S. H. Fernando. Kargo
2001: The graffiti subculture: youth, masculinity, and identity in London and New York. Texts by Nancy Macdonald, Palgrave Macmillan
2002: Aerosol Kingdom – Subway Painters of New York City. Texts by Ivor L. Miller. University Press of Mississippi, Jackson, US
2004: Disruptive Pattern Material: An Encyclopedia of Camouflage. Texts by Hardy Blechman, Alex Newman. Firefly, US
2004: Experimental formats & packaging: creative solutions for inspiring graphic design. Texts by Roger Fawcett-Tang, Daniel Mason, Rotovision
2004: DPM – Disruptive Pattern Material. Texts by Hardy Blechman, Alex Newman. Frances Lincoln
2004: Beautiful Losers – Contemporary Art and Street Culture. Texts by Alex Baker, Thom Collins, Jeffrey Deitch et alt., Aaron Rose et Christian Strike, New York
2005: East Village US. texts by Dan Cameron, Liza Kirwin, Alan W. Moore, The New Museum of Contemporary Art, New York
2006: Can't stop won't stop: une histoire by la génération hip-hop. Texts by Jeff Chang. Allia
2006: Plastic culture: how Japanese toys conquered the world. Texts by Woodrow Phoenix, Kodansha International
2007: The Warhol economy: how fashion, art, and music drive New York City. Texts by Elizabeth Currid, Princeton University Press
2008: Street Art: The Graffiti Revolution. Texts by Cedar Lewisohn, Tate, London
2008: The Elms Lesters Book and Christmas Exhibition. Texts by Ben Jones, Paul Jones et alt. Elms Lesters Paintings Rooms, London
2009: Subway Art: 25th Anniversary Edition. Texts by Martha Cooper, Henry Chalfant, Chronicle Books
2009: American Graffiti. Margo Thompson. Parkstone
2009: Graffiti New York. Texts by Eric Felisbret, James Prigoff, Luke Felisbret, Abrams
2009: Natural Selection. Texts by Fiona McKinnon, Iain Cadby, Atkinson Gallery, Somerset, UK
2009: Blade – King of Kings. Henk Pijnenburg, Henk Pijnenburg
2009: Né dans la rue: Graffiti. Texts by Hervé Chandes, Fondation Cartier pour l'Art Contemporain, Paris
2009: From Style Writing to Art (A Street Art Anthology). Texts by Magda Danysz, Marie-Noëlle Dana, Galerie Magda Danysz, Paris, Drago, Italy
2010: Beyond the Street: The 100 Leading Figures in Urban Art. Texts by Patrick Nguyen, Stuart Mackenzie, Die Gestalten Verlag
2011: 100 artistes du Street Art. With direction by Paul Ardenne. Texts by Marie Maertens. Martinière, Paris
2012: Is The Art World Ready for Graffiti?. Steven Hager, Steven Hager at Smashwords, Los Gatos, US
2012: Graffiti, une histoire en images. Bernard Fontaine. Eyrolles, Paris
2012: Futura 2012 – Expansions. Text by Paul Ardenne, Galerie Jérôme by Noirmont, Paris

Solo exhibitions
 1982 Futura 2000, Fnac-Strasbourg, Strasbourg
 1982 Futura 2000, Fun Gallery, New York
 1983 Futura 2000, Yvon Lambert Gallery, Paris
 1983 Futura 2000, Fun Gallery, New York
 1983 Futura 2000, Yaki Korinblit Gallery, Amsterdam
 1983 Futura 2000, 51X Gallery, New York
 1983 Futura 2000, Baronian-Lambert, Gent
 1983 Futura 2000, Four Blue Squares, San Francisco
 1984 Futura 2000, Yaki Korinblit Gallery, Amsterdam
 1984 Futura 2000, Fun Gallery, New York
 1984 Homage to Picasso, Shafrazi Gallery, New York
 1985 Futura 2000, Shafrazi Gallery, New York
 1985 Futura 2000, Michael Kohn Gallery, Los Angeles
 1986 Futura 2000, Semaphore Gallery, New York
 1988 Futura 2000, Philippe Briet Gallery, New York
 1989 Futura 2000, Galerie du Jour, Paris
 1989 Futura 2000, Musée de Vire, Vire
 1989 Futura 2000, Arcs & Cracs, Barcelona
 1990 Futura 2000, Gallery B5, Monaco
 1990 Futura 2000, Philippe Briet Gallery, New York
 1990 Futura 2000, Martin Lawrence Gallery, New York
 1991 Futura 2000, Galerie du Jour, Paris
 1992 Futura 2000, Galerie du Jour, Paris
 1993 Futura 2000, 01 Gallery, Los Angeles
 1994 Untitled, Gallery Cotthem-Knokke, Barcelona
 1994 Futura 2000, Time Space Light, New York
 1996 Futura 2000, Solaria, Fukuoka
 1996 Futura 2000, Livestock Gallery, New York
 1996 Futura 2000, L'Aeronef, Lille
 1999 Futura 2000, Variant, New York
 2000 Futura 2000, Bob, New York
 2001 Futura 2000 x UNKLE Colette, Paris
 2002 Futura 2000 Place, Space 3, Sydney, Australia
 2005 Futura 2000, Year in Pictures V1 Gallery, Copenhagen
 2009 Futura 2000 – Collection Patrick Lerouge, Ecole Spéciale d’Architecture, Paris
 2013 Futura 2000, Ica, London
 2014 Introspective, Magda Danysz Gallery, Paris
 2014 Timewarp, Schusev State Museum Of Architecture, Moscow
 2014 Futura, Md Gallery, Shanghai
 2015 The Bridges of Graffiti, Venice Biennale, Venice
 2016 Futura: NEW HORIZONS, Library Street Collective, Detroit

Collections

Futura's work is held in the following permanent public collections:
Collection de la Société Générale, New York
Fonds Municipal d´Art Contemporain de la Ville de Paris, Paris
Musée de Vire, Vire, France
Museo d'Arte Moderna di Bologna, Bologna, Italy

Appearances in other media
 On The Clash's Combat Rock, Futura delivers a spoken word part on the song "Overpowered by Funk".  The Clash also appeared on his song "The Escapades of Futura."
 In Emile de Antonio's 1982 film In the King of Prussia Futura creates the film's opening title as a graffiti mural.
 On the album MiLight Futura's voice can be heard giving a shoutout to artist DJ Krush.
 In DJ Mehdi's 2002 music video "Breakaway", Futura covers an entire room with his signature tags in black marker and spray paint.
 In the 2005 film Just For Kicks, about sneaker culture in hip hop, as himself.
 John Mayer's 2006 music video "Waiting on the World to Change", alongside graffiti artists DAZE and the Tats Cru.
 The 2006 video game Marc Ecko's Getting Up: Contents Under Pressure as himself.
 In a Motorola advert as himself.
 In a MasterClass, teaching his method and style, as himself.

References

External links
 www.futura2000.com 
 Magda Danysz Gallery - Paris
 

American graffiti artists
Living people
Artists from New York City
1955 births